The 310s decade ran from January 1, 310, to December 31, 319.

Significant people
 Tiridates III, King of Armenia (287–330)
 Ousanas, King of Axum (c.310-c.320)
 Huai, Emperor of China (307 - 313)
 Min, Emperor of China (313 - 317)
 Yuan, Emperor of China (317 - 322)
 Fíacha Sroiptine, High King of Ireland (285-322)
 Ōjin, Emperor of Japan, 270-310
 Nintoku, Emperor of Japan, 313-399
 Shapur II, Sassanid dynasty King of Persia (309-379)
 Galerius, Roman Emperor (305-311)
 Constantine, Roman Emperor (306-337)
 Maxentius, Roman Emperor (306-312)
 Licinius, Roman Emperor (308-324)
 Maximinus II, Roman Emperor (311-313)
 Alexander of Byzantium, Bishop of Byzantium (314-337)
 Pope Eusebius, Pope of the Roman Catholic Church (309-310)
 Metrophanes of Byzantium, Bishop of Byzantium (306-314)
 Miltiades, Pope of the Roman Catholic Church (311-314)
 Sylvester I, Pope of the Roman Catholic Church (314-335)
Girim, King of Silla (298–310)
Heulhae, King of Silla (310–356)

References